The SubSonex is an experimental, single-seat, amateur-built jet aircraft from Sonex Aircraft's "Hornet's Nest" development division.

Design and development 

The JSX-1 is a single place, single engine, jet aircraft similar in design to an Onex, with a Waiex style Y tail, fixed main landing gear and a retractable nosewheel. It was introduced at AirVenture 2009. It is powered by a Czech-built PBS TJ100 turbojet engine mounted above the aft fuselage, with the exhaust exiting between the Y-tail. The SubSonex achieved first engine test runs in December 2009. The engine produces 1100 N (240 lb) of thrust. Originally developed with only a central mono pod wheel, tail wheel and small wing tip outriggers, the prototype exhibited directional controllability problems during taxi-tests.

The production model of the SubSonex is the JSX-2. The landing gear was changed to a fully retractable, pneumatically-operated, tricycle configuration. It was flight tested by Jet-sailplane performer Bob Carlton in August 2011.

At AirVenture 2013 the company began taking US$10,000 deposits on production kits. The projected price of the kit was US$125,000 in 2013 and US$135,000 in 2014.

The first JSX-2 kit was shipped to a customer in February 2015, and was completed and flown in October 2015.

Operational history
By January 2022, 17 examples had been registered in the United States with the Federal Aviation Administration.

Variants
JSX-1
Prototype version.

JSX-2
Second version with a BRS parachute, wider fuselage, more streamlined nose, and fully retractable undercarriage. Bob Carlton performed the first test flight with the prototype JSX-2 on 10 July 2014 from Wittman Field. Entered production as an amateur-built kit in the fall of 2014.
JSX-2T
Two-seats in side-by-side configuration version announced in July 2019. It will use the same PBS TJ-100 turbojet engine with the PBS TJ-150 as an option. The aircraft was expected to be first publicly displayed at Airventure in July 2020, but the event was cancelled due to the COVID-19 pandemic.
NASC Tracer
Twin-jet UAV model for military and civil applications, designed by Sonex and the Navmar Applied Sciences Corporation (NASC)

Specifications (JSX-2)

See also

References

External links

Web Interview on SubSonex Progress 
The Second Coming of the Microjet, by Paul Bertorelli, AVweb

Homebuilt aircraft
Microjets
Single-engined jet aircraft
Low-wing aircraft
Aircraft first flown in 2011
V-tail aircraft
2010s United States sport aircraft